Airplane mode is a setting for smartphones.

Airplane mode can also refer to:

 Airplane Mode (2019 film), starring Logan Paul
 Airplane Mode (2020 film), a Brazilian film
 "Airplane Mode", a song by Flobots from Survival Story
 Modalità aereo ('Airplane mode'), a 2019 Italian comedy film

See also
Aircraft dynamic modes, describing the dynamic stability of an aircraft